Noah Adrian Gordon (born September 19, 1971, in Sparta, Illinois) is an American country music singer and songwriter. He had been a musician since childhood, playing mandolin and drums in his parents' band, and he began playing drums for Randy Travis at age ten.

After graduating high school, Gordon signed to Liberty Records sister label Patriot Records. There, he released his debut album I Need a Break on February 7, 1995. The album produced the single "The Blue Pages," which spent three weeks on the Billboard country charts, peaking at No. 68. Billboard gave the album a positive review, saying that its opening track "may leave you with the impression that Gordon is yet another honky-tonk pretender," but considered the other tracks to be strongly written. In January 1999, Gordon and Bryan Austin, also a former Patriot Records recording artist, founded a band called Phoenix.

Gordon has written songs for other artists, including "You Still Own Me" by Johnny Reid (also released by Emerson Drive), "You Are" by John Michael Montgomery (also released by Chad Brock) and "The Call" by Matt Kennon. He has also co-produced several of Colt Ford's albums.

Discography

Studio albums

Singles

Music videos

References

1971 births
American country drummers
American country singer-songwriters
Living people
American mandolinists
Singer-songwriters from Illinois
Liberty Records artists
People from Sparta, Illinois
20th-century American drummers
American male drummers
21st-century American male singers
21st-century American singers
Country musicians from Illinois
21st-century American drummers
American male singer-songwriters